Joseph A. Jackson  (1861–1940) was an American architect who designed many buildings for Roman Catholic clients in the Eastern United States, especially Connecticut.

Early life and education
Jackson was born 1861 in Waterbury, Connecticut and studied in the public schools of the city. After  High school he studied for one year at St. Francis College, Brooklyn, New York. Having decided to make architecture his profession, he worked first with Albert M. West, and afterward with Robert W. Hill (1881–1887). Thereafter, he started his own firm with offices in Waterbury.

Architectural practice
At first Jackson worked on a large number of public buildings, including  the Bank Street and Clay Street schools, the convents of Notre Dame and St. Mary, St. Patrick's hall, the new High school, the Judd building, and the Bohl building, all in Waterbury, CT.
Around 1900 when he moved from Waterbury to New Haven, he decided to concentrate primarily on the design of churches and related buildings, mostly for catholic clients. In an advertisement from the 1921 edition of The Catholic Quarterly Review, he describes his practice as “Church Architect,” that specialized in “churches, convents, schools and ecclesiastical work. Plans and Consultations on all matters pertaining to Church Designing and Construction.”
He maintained a satellite office at 184 Livingstone Street, New Haven, Connecticut, as well as his main office in the Townsend Building, 1123 Broadway New York City.

Works
 St. Joseph Church (South NorwalkGreenwich, Connecticut) (first church, dating from 1902. demolished 1969)
 SS. Cyril and Methodius Church Bridgeport, Connecticut
 St. Joseph Church, Bristol, Connecticut
 St. Michael Church, Derby, Connecticut
 St. Margaret Church, Madison, Connecticut
 Our Lady of Mount Carmel Church, Meriden, Connecticut
 St. Jeseph School, Meriden, CT
 St. John the Baptist Church, New Haven, Connecticut
 St. Joseph Church, New Haven, Connecticut
 St. Thomas the Apostle Church, Plainfield, Connecticut
 St. Mary Church,  Simsbury, Connecticut
 St. Joseph Church, South Norwalk, Connecticut
 Sacred Heart Church, Torrington, Connecticut
 Our Lady of Lourdes Church, Waterbury, Connecticut
 St. Casmir Church, Newark, New Jersey
 St. Stephen Church, North Plainfield, New Jersey
 St. Leo Church, Irvington, New Jersey
 Our Lady of Mt. Carmel Church, Ware, Massachusetts
 St. Mary Church, Ridgefield, Connecticut
 St. Bernard Church and School, Rockville, Connecticut
 St. Bridget Church, Manchester, Connecticut
Our Lady of Mt. Carmel School and Convent, Bayonne, New Jersey

References

`

1861 births
1940 deaths
Architects from Waterbury, Connecticut
Architects from New York City
Architects from New Haven, Connecticut
Architects of Roman Catholic churches
American ecclesiastical architects
Gothic Revival architects
St. Francis College alumni